Allison Glock (born in West Virginia) is an American non-fiction writer.

Life
She graduated from Indiana University, and from Syracuse University with an MA.

Her work has appeared in The New York Times, The New York Times Magazine, Esquire, GQ, Maxim, Men's Journal, The New Yorker, Food & Wine, Elle, Garden & Gun, Oprah Magazine, Marie Claire, Rolling Stone.

She is a Senior Staff Writer for ESPN.

Awards
 2004 Whiting Award

Works
 "I Blame Blogs", Poetry Foundation, 5.15.09
 
 "Sweet Tea: A Love Story", Garden & Gun
 "Perfect Fit: The Right Bra", The New Yorker, March 19, 2001

References

External links
Profile at The Whiting Foundation

Living people
American non-fiction writers
Indiana University alumni
Syracuse University alumni
Writers from West Virginia
Year of birth missing (living people)